Tikiri Banda Jayasundera (born 4 May 1927, date of death unknown) was a Ceylonese politician. He was the member of Parliament of Sri Lanka from Udunuwara representing the Sri Lanka Freedom Party. He was defeated in the by D.B. Wijetunga in the 1965 general election. Jayasundera is deceased.

References

1927 births
Year of death missing
Members of the 4th Parliament of Ceylon
Members of the 5th Parliament of Ceylon
Members of the 7th Parliament of Ceylon
Sri Lanka Freedom Party politicians